WPTP may refer to:

 WPTP-LP, a low-power radio station (100.1 FM) licensed to serve Chattanooga, Tennessee, United States
 WPTP-LP (defunct), a defunct low-power radio station (104.3 FM) formerly licensed to serve Marble, North Carolina, United States